Gorgo is a 1961 science fiction giant monster film directed by Eugène Lourié, an international co-production of the United Kingdom, the United States, and Ireland. The story is about a ship’s captain and his pearl diving crew who, with other fishermen on an island and an orphaned boy, discover and capture a gigantic amphibious sea creature and take it to London for public exhibition. This results in the creature's much larger mother invading London in search of her offspring, causing catastrophic destruction across the city.

Plot
Captain Joe Ryan is salvaging for treasure off the coast of Ireland when a volcano erupts, nearly sinking his ship. Ryan and his First Officer and friend, Sam Slade, take the ship to Nara Island for repairs. Before the Harbour Master, Mr McCartin, arrives to assist them, the crew meet Sean, an orphan, who assists McCartin: he invites them to see his collection of ancient Viking relics. Ryan finds himself intrigued by a relic bearing the image of a creature that Sean calls "Ogra, the sea spirit".

Joe and Sam consult the surly  McCartin and discover he has more than archaeological interest when he shows them his stash of illegally salvaged gold relics from the harbour. Ryan warns him to stop being unhelpful or else he will call the police. As Ryan's divers check the harbour for other divers who mysteriously disappeared, one of them emerges and dies from "fear". That night a group of fishermen go out to check the water. They are attacked by a gigantic creature, but successfully drive it off with firebrands.
 
After meeting the fishermen and with help from McCartin, Ryan and his crew manage to capture the creature and haul it onto their ship. Sean warns them that they have made a mistake, but the crew ignore him. Hearing of the creature, two university scientists arrive to meet Ryan and Slade, hoping to obtain it for scientific study. However, Ryan has already sold the creature to Dorkin's Circus in London.

Dorkin names the creature "Gorgo", after the gorgon Medusa,  before transporting it to a large, enclosed pit for public exhibition in Battersea Park. Ryan and Slade meet the scientists again, who inform them the creature is an infant. With its larger mother still out there, the Royal Navy takes charge of the operation. Later that night Gorgo's mother emerges from the sea and attacks Nara Island in search of her offspring before leaving. When she attacks again in the morning, a Royal Navy destroyer intercepts her, but she proves immune to their weapons and sinks it, killing all aboard.

The mother later attacks London. The military intervene, but fail to stop or destroy her. Ryan and Slade split up to find Sean, with the former finding the boy and keeping him safe. Gorgo's mother is eventually reunited with her offspring and frees him from the pit before they both return safely to the sea.

Cast
 Bill Travers as Captain Joe Ryan
 William Sylvester as First Officer Sam Slade
 Vincent Winter as Sean, the orphaned village boy
 Christopher Rhodes as Kevin McCartin, the Harbour Master
 Joseph O'Conor as Professor Leroy Hendricks
 Bruce Seton as Professor Marius Flaherty
 Martin Benson as Andrew Dorkin, the circus owner
 Basil Dignam as Admiral Hugh Brooks
 Barry Keegan as First Mate Harry
 Dervis Ward as Bosun Mike
 Mick Dillon as Gorgo, and as "Ogra", Gorgo's mother

Production
The film was originally intended to be set in Japan as an homage to Godzilla; the setting was then changed to France, and then finally to the British Isles. According to Bill Warren's film book Keep Watching the Skies, southern Australia was also considered for a locale, but the producers supposedly decided that audiences "wouldn't care" if a monster attacked Australia; its alleged lack of worldwide recognisable landmarks for Gorgo to destroy was also cited as a consideration.

The location where Gorgo first appears, the fictional Nara Island, is an anagram of the Aran Islands, off Ireland's west coast. The exterior scenes set in Ireland were filmed at Bulloch Harbour and Coliemore Harbour, both near the County Dublin town of Dalkey. Other scenes were filmed at the MGM-British Studios in Borehamwood, Hertfordshire.

Scenes where Gorgo is driven through the streets of London were shot on a Sunday morning, when there was little other traffic. The film studio wanted Gorgo to fight the military, despite director Eugène Lourié's objections.

Gorgo's special effects were achieved by suitmation and miniaturisation, a technique pioneered in the Godzilla films. The younger Gorgo was smaller than most giant monsters, so the sets around him were built to a larger scale, leading to an enhanced sense of realism. The creatures were also shot with then-pricey slow-motion cameras to create a sense of scale. The effects were complex and are well respected by special effects artists and fans. The film is also sometimes praised for its innovative ending, in which, unusually for such films, the monsters survive and prevail.

All but one of the human characters with speaking roles are male, the exception being an uncredited woman reporter.

Novel and comic book adaptations

A novelisation of the film was released in paperback at the time of its original release, written by Carson Bingham (real name: Bruce Cassiday) and published by Monarch Books.

From 1961 to 1965, Charlton Comics published 23 issues of the comic book Gorgo. It included work by Spider-Man co-creator Steve Ditko. The series was renamed Fantastic Giants with issue #24, which turned out to be the last issue of the series.

Gorgo also appeared in a three-issue miniseries that started off as Gorgo's Revenge, before it was renamed The Return of Gorgo  with issue #2. The series ran from 1962 to 1964.

In 1990, Steve Ditko illustrated a back-up story in Web of Spider-Man Annual #6 titled "Child Star". In this story, Captain Universe creates huge versions of toys based on Gorgo and Konga to battle giant monsters that are attacking New York City. For copyright reasons, Gorgo's name was altered to "Gorga".This sequence was Ditko paying homage to his earlier work with these two characters in their 1960s Charlton Comics comic book series.

In 1991, A-Plus Comics reprinted issues #1 and 3 in the one-shot comic Attack of the Mutant Monsters. Owing to copyright issues, Gorgo's name was changed to Kegor.

Some of these issues were reprinted (in black and white) in a trade paperback in 2011 called Angry Apes n' Leapin Lizards.

In March 2013, IDW Publishing reprinted all the issues that artist Steve Ditko worked on (Gorgo #1–3, 11 and 13–16 and The Return of Gorgo #2–3) as a deluxe hardcover collection called Ditko's Monsters: Gorgo!.

In April 2019, IDW published a book called Ditko's Monsters: Gorgo vs. Konga which collected issues #1 and 13 of the series.

In September 2021, Fantaco published all the issues Joe Sinnott and Vince Colletta worked on (issues #5-10 and 12) in a collection called Gorgo Attacks!.

Home video
Blu-ray A America - VCI, also includes Ninth Wonder of the World: The Making of Gorgo, a documentary by Daniel Griffith 
Shout! Factory's (Collectable Tin) of Mystery Science Theater 3000 25th Anniversary Edition contains the film, as well as an extended cut of Ninth Wonder of the World: The Making of Gorgo.

Gorgo in popular culture
In 1998, the film was featured on the television series Mystery Science Theater 3000 with film critic Leonard Maltin appearing at the beginning of the episode to introduce the film.   The rights quickly expired and the episode only had two airings, both on the same day. Shout! Factory was able to license the film again and release the episode on DVD as part of the box set Mystery Science Theater 3000: The 25th Anniversary Edition in 2013.

Gorgo was used by rock band Ash for the promo video for Ichiban. It was the seventh release of their A to Z singles series, a year-long 26-single subscription. Using a copy of the DVD and free movie editing software, the video allegedly only cost $8.00 to produce.

In 2010, a short comedy film, Waiting for Gorgo, was produced by British production company Cinemagine. The film was directed by Benjamin Craig and written by M. J. Simpson. The plot focuses on the D.M.O.A., a top secret British government agency charged with preventing the return of the monster Gorgo. Between 2010 and 2012, the film screened at over 26 international film festivals, including Clermont-Ferrand International Short Film Festival, Seattle International Film Festival, and Strasbourg European Fantastic Film Festival.

Former Maine governor Angus King used a clip from Gorgo in an advertisement for his 2012 run for the United States Senate.

In the Disney remake Flubber, Flubber was seen flicking through television channels when it had separated into several versions of itself. Scenes of Gorgo's mother rampaging through London could be seen flashing on the screen as Flubber is switching channels.

Gorgo made a cameo in The Twisted Tales of Felix the Cat.

References

External links

 
 
 Waiting for Gorgo - official site for the short film
 Gorgo at Don Markstein's Toonopedia. Archived from the original on August 29, 2016.
 Rerecording of Gorgo soundtrack

Films set in London
Films set in Ireland
1961 films
1960s fantasy films
British fantasy films
British science fiction films
British monster movies
Kaiju films
Giant monster films
Films shot in the Republic of Ireland
Films about dinosaurs
Films directed by Eugène Lourié
Metro-Goldwyn-Mayer films
Films adapted into comics
1960 comics debuts
Comics based on films
American fantasy films
American science fiction films
1960s science fiction films
Films scored by Angelo Francesco Lavagnino
Films set in amusement parks
Films about mother–son relationships
Films shot at MGM-British Studios
1960s English-language films
1960s American films
1960s British films
1960s Japanese films
Films about orphans
American independent films
British independent films